Kristina Elizabeth Anapau Roper (born October 30, 1979), better known as Kristina Anapau, is an American actress and writer.  She is known for her roles as Maurella on the HBO series True Blood and as Galina in the 2010 film Black Swan.

Early life
Kristina Elizabeth Anapau Roper was born in Hawaii. She graduated from high school at age 15 and began her studies at University of Hawaii at Manoa that same year. Before gaining success as an actress, Anapau had intended to become a classical ballerina, having trained seriously since the age of 4.
She is a classically trained pianist and holds a Bachelor of Science degree from Skidmore College in New York.

Career

Early career (1997–2009)
As a student of 16, while majoring in Art History and Dance, and with no plans of being an actress, Anapau was discovered by a talent agent and encouraged to audition for the 1997 film Escape from Atlantis (1997), which filmed in Anapau's native Hawaii.  She landed the role of Katriana in the production and at the request of the film's director, Strathford Hamilton, she relocated to Los Angeles where she pursued more work, ultimately continuing to work steadily across theater, film, and television.

Over the next few years, Anapau appeared in numerous productions, including the films Madison, the comedy 100 Girls, and The Opposite Sex, as well as TV series General Hospital and Once and Again.

At age 20, Anapau joined the girl group "3G's" and they landed a recording contract with Hollywood Records and they spent the better part of a year recording an album and opening for Destiny's Child on MTV's TRL Tour.

Anapau starred in the 2005 thriller Cursed, then appeared in the independent feature Self Medicated. She also starred as Cassidy Merteuil in Cruel Intentions 3.  During this time, Anapau guest starred and recurred on many television series, including House, M.D., CSI:NY, Monk, Without A Trace, and Knight Rider.

Anapau also starred opposite comedian Dane Cook in the Sony Television produced pilot, Cooked.

Recent work (2009–present)

In 2009, Anapau was cast in Black Swan, directed by Darren Aronofsky. "Darren is a genius whose focus and discipline on set is contagious", Anapau said in an interview, reflecting on her work in the 2010 film. "To say that working on Black Swan was inspiring would be an understatement."

Anapau then completed several independent films including The Speak and the paranormal thriller 5 Souls, which she also co-produced.  She appeared on an episode of the AMC series The Glades and then went on to land the role of faerie, Maurella, in HBO's hit series, True Blood, appearing in five episodes over the fourth and fifth seasons.

In 2012, Anapau appeared on the NBC show Grimm, where she played  "Megan Marston, a quiet, sheepish secretary working at a Wesen church who is actually a sheep-like creature dubbed a Seelengut".

Anapau starred as Theresa in the 2014 paranormal feature Altergeist (aka Sighting).

Anapau says she enjoys working in film and television equally, saying they have their "respective pleasures and challenges" and simply looks "for content that inspires me and hopefully elevates the world in some way—films have a track record of best fulfilling both the previous and the later, but there are some really incredible television shows out there that are doing the same. There is a lot of freedom to cross back and forth within the industry now."

True Blood
Anapau made her debut as the faerie Maurella on episode of 11 of True Blood'''s fourth season, and reprised the role in four episodes of the fifth season.

The actress told The Huffington Post in an interview that "It was such a privilege to join the cast of True Blood. I was a huge Alan Ball fan prior to joining the show-- I'm so fortunate to work with an amazing group of people, immensely talented actors and fantastic crew."

When asked about seeing a greater prevalence of strong, powerful female characters like those on True Blood, Anapau says,  "Women audience members want to see strong women doing interesting things in film and on television – it's good for the industry and great for the world."

Public image
Anapau has appeared on the cover of the Holiday 2012 issues of both Modern Luxury and Status LA magazine.

She has also been a cover model for magazines such as MUSE, Faerie, Prodijee, and Stuff. In January 2003, Anapau was ranked #98 on Stuff magazine's "103 Sexiest Women in the World".

Other ventures
2012 marked Anapau's entry into the realm of editorial writing, with published articles in The Stndrd magazine, Status LA magazine, and The Hollywood Film Journal.

 Filmography 
Film

Television

Awards and nominations
She won the Copper Wing Award at the 2006 Phoenix Film Festival for Best Ensemble for Self Medicated'' (2005).

Kristina won the Actress No Ka Oi award at the 2011 Big Island Film Festival.

References

External links
 
 

American women writers
American television actresses
Actresses from Hawaii
University of Hawaiʻi at Mānoa alumni
1979 births
Living people
American film actresses
Writers from Hawaii
Musicians from Hawaii
American ballerinas
Skidmore College alumni
American stage actresses
20th-century American actresses
21st-century American actresses
21st-century American women pianists
21st-century American pianists